The Men's keirin at the 2018 Commonwealth Games was part of the cycling programme, which took place on 6 April 2018.

Schedule
The schedule is as follows:

All times are Australian Eastern Standard Time (UTC+10)

Results

First round
The top two in each heat advanced directly to the second round; the remainder were sent to the first round repechages.

Heat 1

Heat 2

Heat 3

Heat 4

First round repechages
Only the repechage winners advanced to the second round.

Heat 1

Heat 2

Heat 3

Heat 4

Second round
The top three in each heat advanced to the final; the remainder were sent to the small final (for places 7–12).

Heat 1

Heat 2

Finals
The final classification is determined in the medal finals.

Final (places 7–12)

Final (places 1–6)

References

Men's keirin
Cycling at the Commonwealth Games – Men's keirin